Daniil Sergeevich Barantsev (born March 10, 1982) is a Russian-American former competitive ice dancer. With partner and wife Jennifer Wester, he is the 2007 Nebelhorn Trophy champion. He is a two-time (2000, 2001) World Junior champion with earlier partner Natalia Romaniuta.

Personal life 
Daniil Barantsev was born March 10, 1982, in Yekaterinburg, Russian SFSR. He has a younger sister, Maria. He moved to the United States in 2002. 

Barantsev married Jennifer Wester on May 6, 2006. They have two sons, Anden Daniel Barantsev, born on December 29, 2011, and Devin, born in July 2014. 

He now lives and works in Dallas, Texas.

Career

For Russia 
Barantsev began skating at age four and was coached by Alexei Gorshkov from 1994 to 2002. He competed in singles from 1986-1997, competing through the Junior level equivalent of USFigureSkating under the Russian system. He teamed up with Natalia Romaniuta in 1996. They began competing on the ISU Junior Grand Prix Series in 1997, winning a silver medal and placing 4th at their two events. They qualified for their first ISU Junior Grand Prix Final, where they finished 5th. They placed 7th in their first appearance at the World Junior Championships. In 1997, Barantsev dropped his competitive track in singles skating to pursue goals in the partnered discipline of ice dance under the direction of the Russian system of development.

The following season, Romaniuta/Barantsev won gold and silver on JGP series and qualified for their second Final, where they took the bronze medal. They finished their season with bronze at the 1999 World Junior Championships.

In 1999–2000, Romaniuta/Barantsev won gold in every junior-level they entered, including the JGP Final and the 2000 World Junior Championships. They also made their senior international debut at the 2000 World Championships in Nice, France, finishing 16th.

In 2000–2001, they competed on the senior Grand Prix series, finishing 6th and 9th at their two events. They were sent again to Junior Worlds and took their second gold medal at the event.

In the 2001–2002 season, Romaniuta/Barantsev competed a second season on the Grand Prix series, winning bronze at the 2001 Sparkassen Cup and placing 5th at 2001 Cup of Russia. They were assigned to the 2002 European Championships but withdrew from the event. Their partnership ended in 2002.

For the United States 
Barantsev moved to the United States to work with Nikolai Morozov, who coached him from 2002 to 2007. He teamed up with Jennifer Wester in Newington, Connecticut, in March 2003. She underwent surgery on her shoulder in 2003 and again in 2004.

Skating association paperwork issues prevented Wester/Barantsev from competing nationally until 2005. As a result of ISU paperwork regulations, they remained ineligible for international competitions until the Russian Skating Federation granted Barantsev a release, in January 2007. In the same month, Wester injured her knee in a practice immediately prior to the 2007 U.S. Championships, where they finished sixth. Initially believed to be a severe bone bruise, her injury was diagnosed in April 2007 as a fractured patella requiring immediate surgery. 

In the summer of 2007, Wester/Barantsev moved to Bloomfield Hills, Michigan, to train at the Detroit Skating Club under the tutelage of Anjelika Krylova and Pasquale Camerlengo. Recovering slowly from her injury, Wester returned to the ice around mid-June 2007. In September, the duo won gold at the 2007 Nebelhorn Trophy, skating in their first international competition as a team. 

Wester/Barantsev placed fourth at their first ISU Championship together, the 2008 Four Continents Championships. In autumn 2008, they debuted on the Grand Prix series, Wester competing with pneumonia.

A back injury to Barantsev led them to withdraw from the U.S. Championships in January 2009 and Wester underwent knee surgery later that year. The two did not compete the following season and retired from competition.

Coaching 
In 2010, Barantsev began coaching full time in Connecticut. In 2017, Daniil moved from Connecticut to Texas.

Programs

With Wester

With Romaniuta

Results

With Wester for the United States

With Romaniuta for Russia

References

External links

 
 

American male ice dancers
Russian male ice dancers
1982 births
Living people
Sportspeople from Yekaterinburg
World Junior Figure Skating Championships medalists